Typhonium flagelliforme is a species of flowering plant in the family Araceae.

Typhonium flagelliforme is native to Guangdong, Guangxi, Yunnan, Bangladesh, Bhutan, Cambodia, India, Indonesia, Laos, Malaysia, Myanmar, Philippines, Singapore, Sri Lanka, Thailand, New Guinea, Queensland, and the Australian Northern Territory.

References

flagelliforme
Flora of Asia
Flora of New Guinea
Flora of Australia
Plants described in 1819